Drapetodes nummularia is a moth in the family Drepanidae. It was described by Snellen in 1889. It is found on Java, Peninsular Malaysia and Borneo.

References

Moths described in 1889
Drepaninae